This was the first edition of the event.

Gary Donnelly and Gary Muller won the title, defeating Brad Pearce and Jim Pugh 7–6, 6–2 in the final.

Seeds

  Gary Donnelly /  Gary Muller (champions)
  Brad Pearce /  Jim Pugh (final)
  Marc Flur /  Chip Hooper (quarterfinals)
  John Letts /  Michael Robertson (quarterfinals)

Draw

Draw

References
Draw

OTB Open
1987 Grand Prix (tennis)